Mosul is a village and municipality in the Zaqatala Rayon of Azerbaijan.  It has a population of 2,842. 80% of population is Ingiloys.

References 

Populated places in Zaqatala District